Lawrence "Larry" Ross (1922-1995) was an American ice hockey goaltender and coach who played for Minnesota in the early 1950s and is a member of the United States Hockey Hall of Fame.

Early life
Ross was born in Duluth, Minnesota, and graduated from Morgan Park High School in 1940. He joined the United States Navy and played for the naval ice hockey team during World War II. After the war, Ross returned to Minnesota and continued to play in amateur hockey leagues for several years before matriculating to the University of Minnesota.

Ross was a two-year starter for Minnesota, playing in 32 games from 1950 to 1952 and was an AHCA First Team All-American in 1950–51.

Career 
After graduating from college, Ross became the head coach at International Falls High School in 1954 and remained with the team for 31 years. In that time Ross led the team to 13 state tournaments, winning 6 Minnesota State Championships. During his tenure the team compiled a 566–169–21 record and went undefeated for three consecutive seasons from 1964 through 1966. Ross coached 12 players who reached the NHL and 8 olympians. Towards the end of his coaching career, Ross became a scout for the Hartford Whalers and wrote a book titled "Hockey for Everyone".

He was named as the Coach of the Year in 1983 by the Minnesota Hockey Coaches Association and, in his final season with International Falls, he received the National High School Special Sports award. He was inducted into the United States Hockey Hall of Fame in 1988 and received the John Mariucci College Award the same year. Upon his retirement in 1985, his Minnesota classmate Bob Johnson summed up his career: "He made a 100% commitment to his job and the sport of hockey."

Statistics

Regular season and playoffs

Awards and honors

References

External links

American men's ice hockey goaltenders
Ice hockey coaches from Minnesota
Minnesota Golden Gophers men's ice hockey players
United States Navy personnel of World War II
Military personnel from Minnesota
United States Navy sailors
United States Hockey Hall of Fame inductees
1922 births
1995 deaths
People from Duluth, Minnesota
AHCA Division I men's ice hockey All-Americans
Ice hockey people from Duluth, Minnesota